Henri Paul Nénot (27 May 1853 – 1934) was a noted French architect.

Biography
Nénot was born in Paris. After his initial training in an architectural workshop, he entered the studio of Charles-Auguste Questel at the École Nationale Supérieure des Beaux-Arts while also working for various architects, including Charles Garnier. He was in residence at the Villa Medici 1878–1881.

In 1882 Nénot began his career, during which he was appointed architect of the Sorbonne, which remains his great work, as well as designing other university buildings in Paris and a number of private residential and commercial buildings. In 1895 he was elected department chair for architecture in the Académie des beaux-arts. His last position was Director General for the architecture of the Palace of Nations in Geneva, where he died in an accident.

Principal works 

 1875: école normale d'Huy in Belgium, with sculptor Eugène André Oudiné
 1882–1901: new Sorbonne, 5th arrondissement
 1887: tomb of Mlle Labiche in the cemetery of Béville-le-Comte
 1888: building for M. Quettier at Lorient
 1891: building for MM. Labiche and Gréard, rue Guynemer, 6th arrondissement
 1893: house for M. Richardot at Charenton-le-Pont
 1896: monument to commandant Rolland at Bourget 
 1900: monument to Victor Duruy, avenue Rey in Villeneuve-Saint-Georges (Val-de-Marne)
 1900: hôtel Blumenthal-Montmorency, 34 avenue Foch, 16th arrondissement
 1905: headquarters of the Banque Louis Dreyfus, 10–12 rue de la banque, 2nd arrondissement
 1907: hôtel Meurice, 238 rue de Rivoli, 1st arrondissement
 1909: monument to Octave Gréard sq. Paul-Painlevé, 5th arrondissement with sculptor Jules-Clément Chaplain
 1910–1926: Institut de chimie, now École nationale supérieure de chimie de Paris, 5th arrondissement
 1911: Institut océanographique, 195, rue Saint-Jacques, 5th arrondissement
 1911-1913: Headquarters of the Suez Canal Company at 1, rue d'Astorg in Paris
 1914–1926: Institut de géographie, 5th arrondissement
 1921: building for Dreyfus, 410 Av. Alem, Buenos Aires
 1922–1928: Place Carnegie de Fargniers, now commune de Tergnier (Aisne) with Paul Bigot (an ensemble comprising la mairie, un bureau de poste, un poste de police, une pompe, une halle, une salle d' assemblée, le foyer Carnegie, un établissement de bains, des écoles, des espaces verts et de jeux) (inscrit MH)
 1925:  monument to the war dead 1914–1918 in the Gassin cemetery (Var)
 1930: Le Paladium bd du Tsarévitch at Nice with Edmond Labbé
 1931–1937: Palace of Nations of the League of Nations at Geneva with Julien Flegenheimer, Camille Lefèvre, Carlo Broggi and Jozsef Vago

Notes

References 
 A. Louvet, "Paul-Henri Nénot (1853–1934)", L'Architecture, 1935, n° 7, pp. 241–244.
 Jean Favier, "Le Palais de la Société des nations à Genève", La Construction moderne, n°2, 10 oct. 1937, pp. 26–36.
 Jean Favier, "La rétrospective Paul-Henri Nénot (1853–1934)", La Construction moderne, n°32, 17 juil. 1938, pp. 527–531.
 Structurae entry

External links 
 

1853 births
1934 deaths
Architects from Paris
19th-century French architects
20th-century French architects
École des Beaux-Arts alumni
Members of the Académie des beaux-arts
Recipients of the Royal Gold Medal
Prix de Rome for architecture